Krušec is a Slovenian surname. Notable people with the surname include:
Dejan Krušec, Slovenian economist
Lena Krušec (born 1976), Slovenian architect
Matjaž Krušec, Slovenian figure skating official
Tomaž Krušec (born 1972), Slovenian architect

Slovene-language surnames